Balanophyllia elegans, the orange coral or orange cup coral, is a species of solitary cup coral, a stony coral in the family Dendrophylliidae. It is native to the eastern Pacific Ocean. As an azooxanthellate species, it does not contain symbiotic dinoflagellates in its tissues in the way that most corals do.

Description
B. elegans is a solitary species of cup coral. The polyp is large and fleshy with tapering tentacles bearing groups of stinging cells. The polyp can almost completely retract into its stony corallite cup. This coral can be distinguished from the corallimorph Corynactis californica, which it somewhat resembles, by its stony skeleton, and from Caryophyllia alaskensis, another stony coral found in this habitat, by its brighter colour (C. alaskensis is beige).

Distribution and habitat
The species is native to the western seaboard of North America, from British Columbia to Baja California. It appreciates habitats with vigorous water movement, such as surge channels, and often grows in caves and under overhangs. It is often found living amongst kelp such as Macrocystis integrifolia.

Biology
Being an azooxanthellate coral, that is, not containing symbiotic dinoflagellate algae that photosynthesise, B. elegans feeds on whatever the tentacles can catch, with the aid of their nematocysts (stinging cells) and spirocysts (cells containing hollow adhesive threads which coil around the prey). The mouth is large and slit-shaped, and it is possible that some prey is caught by use of the mesenteries in the gastrovascular cavity while opening the mouth wide, however its main prey is zooplankton caught by the tentacles. This coral can also extract dissolved organic carbon from sea water, and during the winter months, when there is a scarcity of zooplankton, this source of nutrition may be critical for the coral's survival.

The sexes are separate in this coral. Fertilisation takes place inside the female's gastrovascular cavity, and the larvae are brooded there. They are later released as worm-like orange larvae and settle nearby.

References

External links
 

Dendrophylliidae
Corals described in 1864